The 1931–32 season was East Stirlingshire Football Club's eighth consecutive season in the Scottish Division Two, having been promoted from the inaugural Division Three in 1923–24. The club also competed in the Scottish Cup and the minor Stirlingshire Cup.

Fixtures and results

Scottish Second Division

League table

Results by round

Scottish Cup

Other

Stirlingshire Cup

See also
List of East Stirlingshire F.C. seasons

References

External links 
 East Stirlingshire FC official site

East Stirlingshire F.C. seasons
East Stirlingshire